Fritz: The Walter Mondale Story is a television documentary film detailing the life of former American Vice President Walter "Fritz" Mondale. It is narrated by his daughter, Eleanor Mondale.

Plot Synopsis
The film is composed of rare archival footage, family home videos, and interviews with President Jimmy Carter, Vice President Al Gore, Representative Geraldine Ferraro, Minnesota Governor Arne Carlson, and his friends and family. It follows his life through his various roles as attorney general, senator, vice president, presidential candidate, ambassador, and professor.

Reception
Despite his initial reluctance to participate, the film was very positively received by Walter Mondale and his family.

References

External links
 
 Official Website

Documentary films about American politicians
2008 television films
2008 films
American documentary films
Walter Mondale
2000s American films